Sharrott may refer to:
Sharrott Winery, a winery in New Jersey

People with the surname
George Sharrott, Major League Baseball player
Jack Sharrott, Major League Baseball player